Mehmet Siddik Istemi (born 20 April 1991) is a Turkish footballer who plays as a midfielder for Etimesgut Belediyespor.

References

External links
 

1991 births
Sportspeople from Diyarbakır
Living people
Turkish footballers
Association football midfielders
Diyarbakırspor footballers
1461 Trabzon footballers
Karşıyaka S.K. footballers
Şanlıurfaspor footballers
Pendikspor footballers
Süper Lig players
TFF First League players
TFF Second League players

}